Yaragudipati Varada Rao (Telugu: యెర్రగుడిపాటి వరదరావు; 30 May 1903 – 13 February 1979) was an Indian director, producer, actor, screenwriter, and editor known for his works primarily in Telugu, Kannada, and Tamil films. Rao plunged into theatre and did a few stage plays before moving to Kolhapur and Bombay to act in silent films. Rao started his career as a lead actor in many silent films such as Gajendra Moksham (1923), Garuda Garvabhangam (1929), and Rose of Rajasthan (1931). Regarded as one of the greatest filmmaking pioneers of the Cinema of South India, he made motion-pictures across Telugu, Kannada, Tamil, Konkani, and Hindi languages, apart from silent films.

Rao made significant contributions to South cinema during the British rule in India. Rao's 1934 film Sati Sulochana was the first talkie film in the Kannada language. In 1937, he directed the hagiographical classic Chintamani, the Tamil sleeper hit ran for a year with highest estimated footfall at a single screen in India, and British Ceylon. Rao's 1938 film Swarnalatha was one of the finest political drama scripted by Ayyalu Somayajulu; with prohibition as the central theme, in which Rao played the lead. The film was shot extensively at Newtone Studios, Kilpauk, during Madras Presidency. Rao's 1940 film, Viswa Mohini, is the first Indian film, depicting the Indian movie world, scripted by Balijepalli Lakshmikanta Kavi, starring V. Nagayya. Rao subsequently made the mythology sequel films Savithiri (1941), and Sathyabhama (1942) casting thespian Sthanam Narasimha Rao.

Personal life 
Yaragudipati Varada Rao was born in Telugu Brahmin family of Nellore in the then Madras Presidency of British India in May 1903. In the late 1920s, he moved to Madras and ventured into Kannada cinema. He married Kumari Rukmini who was paired with him in Lavangi (1946). Indian actress Lakshmi is their daughter.

Early career
Rao moved into film direction and made silent films such as Pandava Nirvan (1930), Pandava Agnathavaas (1930) and Hari Maya (1932). In 1932, a Marwari businessman, Chamanlal Doongaji from Bangalore, launched South India Movie Tone. Rao directed this blockbuster film shot at Chatrapathi Cinetone, in Kolhapur; the shooting took eight weeks. He then directed Hari Maya (1932) that starred his first wife, Rajam.

Selected filmography
As Director
1930: Pandava Agyathavas (silent) 
1930: Sarangadhara (silent)
1932: Hari Maya (Kannada - Director) 
1934: Sati Sulochana (Kannada - Cast)
1935: Naganand (Hindi) 
1936: Bhama Parinayam (Tamil) 
1937: Chintamani (Tamil)
1938: Bhakta Meera (Tamil) 
1938: Swarnalatha (Tamil)
1939: Malli Pelli (Telugu - Cast)
1940: Viswa Mohini (Telugu - Cast)
1941: Savithiri (Tamil - Cast, Singer)
1942: Sathyabhama (Telugu - Cast) 
1944: Thasildar (Telugu - Cast) 
1946: Lavangi (Tamil)
1948: Ramadas (Tamil)
1950: Jeevit Amche Ashe (Konkani)
1952: Manavathi (Telugu-Tamil)
1953: Manjari (Telugu - Cast) 
1956: Bhagya Chakra (Kannada) 
1958: Sri Krishna Garudi (Telugu) 
1961: Nagarjuna (Telugu-Kannada)
1963: Hennina Balu Kanneru (Kannada)

As Producer - Telugu
1964: Thotalo Pilla Kotalo Rani
1965: Aakasa Ramanna
1966: Bhulokamlo Yamalokam
1966: Loguttu Perumaallu Keruka
1967: Devuni Gelichina Manavudu
1967: Gopaludu Bhupaludu
1968: Circar Express
1968: Pala Manasulu
1969: Ardharathri (Cast)
1969: Love in Andhra
1969: Takkari Donga Chakkani Chukka
1970: Paga Sadhistha
1971: Revolver Rani
1972: Monagadosthunnadu Jagratha

References 

1903 births
1979 deaths
Indian male film actors
Tamil film directors
Telugu film editors
Telugu film directors
Kannada film producers
Telugu film producers
Nandi Award winners
Kannada film directors
Telugu screenwriters
Indian editors
Indian cinematographers
Indian silent film directors
20th-century Indian male actors
Male actors from Andhra Pradesh
People from Nellore district
Indian male stage actors
Film producers from Andhra Pradesh
Screenwriters from Andhra Pradesh
Film directors from Andhra Pradesh
20th-century Indian film directors
20th-century Indian dramatists and playwrights
Film editors from Andhra Pradesh
Konkani-language film directors
20th-century Indian screenwriters